The  was held on 2 February 2003 in Kannai Hall, Yokohama, Kanagawa, Japan.

Awards
 Best Film: Hush!
 Best Actor:
Seiichi Tanabe – Hush!
Kyōzō Nagatsuka – The Laughing Frog
 Best Actress: Asaka Seto – Travail
 Best Supporting Actor: Shinya Tsukamoto – Travail, Ichi the Killer, Kuroe
 Best Supporting Actress: Nene Otsuka – The Laughing Frog, Utsutsu
 Best Director:
Ryosuke Hashiguchi – Hush!
Hideyuki Hirayama – The Laughing Frog, Out
 Best New Director: Fumihiko Sori – Ping Pong
 Best Screenplay: Kentarō Ōtani – Travail
 Best Cinematography: Kozo Shibazaki – Out, The Laughing Frog
 Best New Talent:
Masahiro Hisano – Gomen
Yukika Sakuratani – Gomen
Mikako Ichikawa – Travail

Best 10
 Hush!
 Out
 The Twilight Samurai
 KT
 Travail
 Sorry
 The Laughing Frog
 Ping Pong
 Harmful Insect
 Hikari no Ame
runner-up. Ichi the Killer

References

Yokohama Film Festival
Y
Y
2003 in Japanese cinema
February 2003 events in Japan